Atlanta International Pop Festival can refer to:

 Atlanta International Pop Festival (1969), the 1969 festival
 Atlanta International Pop Festival (1970), the 1970 festival
 Live at the Atlanta International Pop Festival: July 3 & 5, 1970, a live album by The Allman Brothers Band released in 2003
 Freedom: Atlanta Pop Festival, a live album by The Jimi Hendrix Experience released in 2015